The 2001 Africa Cup (officially called at that time "Africa Top Six") was the second  edition of the highest-level rugby union tournament in Africa.
Six teams participated (South Africa with an under-23 amateurs team).
The teams were divided in two pools played on a home-away basis.

Division 1 (Africa Cup)

Regional pools

Pool South

Pool North

Final

Division 2
This tournament serve too with the Division 1 for the 2003 Rugby World Cup qualifying.

Round 1
Kenya exempted from the Round 1.

Pool A

Pool B

Round 2

Notes and references 

2001
2001 rugby union tournaments for national teams
2001 in African rugby union